Daniel Gardano Serra (born 24 February 1984) is a Brazilian auto racing driver. He competes full-time in the Brazilian Stock Car Pro Series, driving the No. 29 Chevrolet Cruze for Eurofarma-RC and is also a Ferrari Factory Driver. 

He won 3 times the Stock Car Brasil in the years 2017, 2018 and 2019. He is a two time 24 Hours of Le Mans GTE Pro class winner, having won in 2017 with Darren Turner and Jonathan Adam, while driving for Aston Martin Racing, and again in 2019, with James Calado and Alessandro Pier Guidi, driving for AF Corse.

Career

Son of three-time Stock Car champion Chico Serra, began karting at age 14, after receiving authorization from his parents. He competed in Formula Renault 2.0 Brazil and Eurocup Formula Renault 2.0 (the lack of sponsorship brought him back to Brazil). In Stock Car Light, he finished in runner-up, opened the doors for Stock Car. His debut in the Red Bull-Amir Nasr, scored pole position and finished the Championship as the eighth place. In 2009, he joined Red Bull-WA Mattheis. On 20 September 2009, he won for the first time in Stock Car. After joining Eurofarma RC for the 2017 season, Daniel won his first Stock Car title, a feat he would repeat in the next season. On international level, he has competed part time on the 2017 FIA World Endurance Championship for Aston Martin Racing, winning the 2017 24 Hours of Le Mans. He additionally raced in three races of the 2018–19 WEC season for AF Corse, winning the 2019 24 Hours of Le Mans.

Racing record

Career summary

† - ineligible for points.

Complete Stock Car Brasil results
(key) (Races in bold indicate pole position) (Races in italics indicate fastest lap)

† Did not finish the race, but was classified as he completed over 90% of the race distance.

Complete GT1 World Championship results

Complete IMSA SportsCar Championship results
(key) (Races in bold indicate pole position) (Races in italics indicate fastest lap)

† Serra did not complete sufficient laps in order to score full points. 
* Season still in progress.

Complete FIA World Endurance Championship results
(key) (Races in bold indicate pole position; races in
italics indicate fastest lap)

Complete 24 Hours of Le Mans results

24 Hours of Daytona results

External links
 

1984 births
Living people
Brazilian racing drivers
Stock Car Brasil drivers
TC 2000 Championship drivers
Racing drivers from São Paulo
24 Hours of Daytona drivers
Rolex Sports Car Series drivers
Brazilian WeatherTech SportsCar Championship drivers
Brazilian Formula Renault 2.0 drivers
Formula Renault Eurocup drivers
European Le Mans Series drivers
International GT Open drivers
FIA GT1 World Championship drivers
24 Hours of Le Mans drivers
12 Hours of Sebring drivers
FIA World Endurance Championship drivers
Súper TC 2000 drivers
GT World Challenge America drivers
AF Corse drivers
Aston Martin Racing drivers
Audi Sport drivers
W Racing Team drivers
Cram Competition drivers
Ferrari Competizioni GT drivers
Iron Lynx drivers